Futani is a town and comune in the province of Salerno in the Campania region of south-western Italy.

Geography
The town lies in southern Cilento, on the national road "SS 18" between Cuccaro Vetere and Massicelle. It borders with the municipalities of Ceraso, Cuccaro Vetere, Montano Antilia, Novi Velia and San Mauro la Bruca.

See also
Cilentan dialect
Cilento and Vallo di Diano National Park

References

External links

Cities and towns in Campania
Localities of Cilento